Rock al Parque is a free rock music festival which has taken place in Bogotá, Colombia, since 1995. It typically gathers more than 50 bands and as many as 400,000 spectators. It is considered the largest rock festival in Colombia and one of the most important in Latin America. Its programme also includes ska, punk, hardcore, metal, and other genres.

History

The first edition of the Rock Al Parque festival was held in Bogotá, 26–29 May 1995. It started as a continuation of the 'Youth Music meetings' held at the city's planetarium in 1992. The people behind the organization were Mario Duarte, Julio Correal and Bertha Quintero. They initially sought to gain the support of Bogota's Institute of Culture and Tourism, to help establish the festival. It was held across several venues including 'La Media Torta', Simón Bolívar Park, the 'Olaya Herrera' stadium, and the 'Santa María Bullfighting' ring. The last venue asked for admission fees, and was excluded after 1996 to keep the festival free of charge.

The rock music festival gradually included other genres, such as punk, reggae, ska and blues music. Rather than grouping genres together, the festival's organizers promoted diversity by scheduling different types of musicians to participate alongside one another.

Nowadays the festival takes place over three days at Simon Bolivar Park and is broadcast live over public television channel Canal Capital and public radio network Radiónica.

The sale of alcohol at Rock al Parque is prohibited, as is smoking, despite the fact that the event takes place outdoors. Concertgoers are not allowed entry if they are wearing belts with metallic buckles, as these can be used as weapons. Furthermore, all concertgoers have to go through a routine security inspection before entering the concert grounds. Concerts are scheduled between 1:00 p.m. and 10:00 p.m.

Participants
The festival features national and international bands of different genres. After 1997, artists were selected by a jury after an open multi-stage process (pre-selection, presentation and live auditions). Prizes are awarded to the selected bands, who also gain media exposure and opportunity to share a stage with international bands. Some acts are directly invited by the organizing committee. In its first 15 years, the festival brought 473 artists to 3,092,000 attendees. The 1997 edition of the festival had the largest number of acts, with 87 bands, while the 2002 edition had the fewest, with 25. On average, 51.6 bands have performed annually at Rock al Parque. The 2004 edition, which marked the festival's 10th anniversary, had over 400,000 spectators.

International musicians
The festival has hosted to a number of musical artists from other countries, including:

References

External links

 Official Website 
 iGoNative Festivals and Events in Colombia

 

Music festivals established in 1995
Festivals in Bogotá
Rock festivals in Colombia
Music festivals in Colombia
Free festivals